Amir Syamsuddin (born 27 May 1941) is the former Minister of Justice and Human Rights of Indonesia.

Biography
Amir was born in Makassar, Dutch East Indies, on 27 May 1941 to  Andi Bulaeng Dg Nipati. He graduated with a bachelor's degree in law from the University of Indonesia in 1983, later earning a doctorate from the same university.

In 1983, Amir founded Amir Syamsuddin Law Offices and Partners. He later founded Acemark, an intellectual property firm.

In 2003, Amir represented former Golkar chairman and Speaker of the People's Representative Council Akbar Tanjung when he was charged with corruption. Tanjung was eventually acquitted by the Supreme Court of Indonesia. He also represented the magazine Tempo when it was sued by Probosutedjo. By 2011 Amir was serving as secretary  of the  Democratic Party's ethics council.

On 19 October 2011, Amir, then serving on the board of advisers to the Democratic Party, was selected as Minister of Justice and Human Rights of Indonesia, ceasing his legal practice. He replaced Patrialis Akbar amidst rumours of corruption in the justice system; Patrialis welcomed the appointment. Following his appointment, Amir stated that he intended to end the practice of giving convicted corruptors and terrorists cuts to their sentences.

Reception
Teten Masduki of Transparency International Indonesia welcomed Amir's appointment, saying that he had "made a good first impression"; however, Masduki cautioned that Syamsuddin would have to follow through on his promises. The Jakarta Post reported the former Justice and Human Rights Minister Yusril Ihza Mahendra as "warning" that ending sentence cuts for corruptors and terrorists "might violate human rights and the principle of equal treatment for prisoners".

Personal life
Amir has seven children. He has cited lawyer Suardi Tasrif as an inspiration towards becoming a lawyer.

References
Footnotes

Bibliography

 
 
 
 
 
 
 
 

Living people
Indonesian Muslims
Bugis people
People from Makassar
Indonesian people of Chinese descent
1941 births
Democratic Party (Indonesia) politicians
20th-century Indonesian lawyers
Ministers of law and human rights of Indonesia
21st-century Indonesian lawyers